The Oklahoma salamander (Eurycea tynerensis) is a salamander in the family Plethodontidae,  endemic to the United States. The species was first described by George A. Moore and R. Chester Hughes in 1939. Its natural habitats are temperate forests, rivers, and freshwater springs. It is threatened by habitat loss.

References

External links
Picture
Range map

Eurycea
Endemic fauna of the United States
Amphibians of the United States
Endemic fauna of Arkansas
Endemic fauna of Oklahoma
Natural history of Missouri
Taxonomy articles created by Polbot
Amphibians described in 1939